The World Scrabble Championship 1993 was the second World Scrabble Championship. The winner was Mark Nyman, representing the United Kingdom, as this was before the countries of the UK were given individual representation.

The first 15 rounds used modified Swiss pairing. After this, players #1 and #3 and players #2 and #4 played a best-of-five semifinal to determine the finalists while the remaining 64 players played three more games. The semifinals were followed by a best-of-five finals while the two other semifinalists played a best-of-five match to determine third and fourth place.

The first game of the finals looked like it would go Nyman's way when he bingoed with MUTAGENIC from an MU on his second play and then challenged off Wapnick's DOX. But Nyman later played a phony of his own (VERGINGS) and then got stuck with the Q while Wapnick drew both blanks and won by 38.

In game two, Wapnick drew both blanks again and won by almost 100 points, aided by the 102-point DYSURIC.

Game three was tight until Nyman played two successive bingos and went on to a 530-victory. The fourth game again started close, until Wapnick scored 212 points on three successive turns (though he missed a 107-point bingo in the process) and took a seemingly insurmountable 174-point lead. A few turns later, Wapnick had the opportunity to take a 212 point lead with HELMING, but the play would have opened a triple-triple line with both blanks unseen so he opted for a more conservative 41-point play and still led by 170. Against the odds, Nyman came back with a 50-point X play and bingos with both blanks and went on to a devastating 9-point victory.

The key point in the final game came when Wapnick, holding a blank, played STUM instead of SMUR (of which he was unsure). Nyman then bingoed with BEDAWIN setting up an S-hook on the O column. Unable to play a bingo ending in S because of his STUM play, Wapnick instead played GROANERs when he could have blocked the O column with ORANGiER. Sure enough, Nyman drew an S and played VELURES for 91 points then coasted to an easy win to become the first non-North American to win the world championship.

Complete Results

Semifinals
Mark Nyman 3 – David Gibson 2
Joel Wapnick 3 – Gareth Williams 2
Consolation Match
David Gibson 3 – Gareth Williams 2
Finals
Game 1: Wapnick 446 – Nyman 408
Game 2: Wapnick 443 – Nyman 357
Game 3: Nyman 530 – Wapnick 374
Game 4: Nyman 469 – Wapnick 460
Game 5: Nyman 417 – Wapnick 369

References 

1993
1993 in American sports
1993 in sports in New York (state)